KEJO (1240 AM, "1240 Joe Radio") is a radio station licensed to serve Corvallis, Oregon, United States.  The station, which began broadcasting in August 1955, is currently owned by Bicoastal Media and the broadcast license is held by Bicoastal Media Licenses V, LLC.

Programming
KEJO broadcasts a sports radio format including a mix of local programs and syndicated shows from Fox Sports Radio plus a variety of college and professional sporting events.

Sports talk
Local and regional weekday programs on KEJO include Joe Beaver Show with the Oregon State Beavers radio voices, Mike Parker & Jon Warren, plus an afternoon show called Sports Talk hosted by Steve.  Fox Sports Radio programs on KEJO include First Team with Steve Czaban, The Dan Patrick Show hosted by Dan Patrick, The Jim Rome Show hosted by Jim Rome, Myers & Hartman with Chris Myers and Steve Hartman, Petros and Money Show hosted by Petros Papadakis and Matt "Money" Smith, and J. T. the Brick with J. T. the Brick and Tomm Looney.

Sporting events
In addition to its regularly scheduled sports talk programs, KEJO airs select local high school football games plus Oregon State Beavers football, men's basketball, and baseball as part of the Beaver Sports Radio Network.

Beginning with the 2009 season, KEJO is the broadcast home of the Corvallis Knights minor league baseball team. KEJO is scheduled to broadcast every regular season game the West Coast League team plays. Through the 2008 season, KEJO had been a member of the Seattle Mariners Radio Network.

History

Launch as KCOV
The Midland Broadcasting Company was granted a construction permit in 1953 to build a new AM radio station broadcasting with 250 watts of power on a frequency of 1240 kHz.  KCOV began regular broadcasting in August 1955 with Donald McCormick as president of Midland Broadcasting and Frank Flynn as the general manager of the station.

The KFLY years
Dave Hoss acquired control of Midland Broadcasting in late February 1958.  He promptly applied to the FCC for new call letters for the station and was granted KFLY.

Radio Broadcasters, Inc., acquired KFLY in January 1963.  The Federal Communications Commission granted KFLY authorization a few months later to increase its daytime signal strength to 1,000 watts while maintaining the nighttime signal power of 250 watts.  In October 1966, KFLY-FM (101.5 FM) was launched as an FM sister station, initially duplicating a portion of the AM station's programming and extending its effective coverage area.

Ted Jackson's Radio Corvallis, Inc., bought KFLY in March 1971. The station aired a Top 40 music format throughout the 1970s. KFLY was acquired by the Madgekal Broadcasting Company in August 1977 and the Top 40 format was maintained.  Mario Pastega, the owner of Madgekal Broadcasting, also owned the local Pepsi-Cola bottling plant.

Switch to KEJO
After more than 35 years of broadcasting as KFLY, the station was assigned the current KEJO call letters by the FCC on January 31, 1994. Pastega chose the new callsign as a tribute to his daughter, Emily Jo, who died as a young adult.

In June 1999, Madgekal Broadcasting, Inc., reached an agreement to sell this station to Jacor Communications subsidiary Jacor Licensee of Louisville, Inc.  The deal was approved by the FCC on August 24, 1999, and the transaction was consummated on September 1, 1999.  After Jacor's merger with Clear Channel Communications was completed, Jacor Licensee of Louisville, Inc., made application with the FCC in December 2000 to transfer the broadcast license for KEJO to Clear Channel subsidiary Citicasters Licenses, Inc.  The transfer was approved by the FCC on January 4, 2001, and the transaction was consummated on June 5, 2001.

KEJO today
KEJO was granted a construction permit to upgrade to 1,000 watt operation both day and night on November 2001.  The station received its license to cover this change on September 25, 2003.

In May 2007, Clear Channel Communications, through its Citicasters Licenses, LP, subsidiary, announced an agreement to sell this station to Bicoastal Media subsidiary Bicoastal Willamette Valley, LLC, as part of a 14-station deal valued at $37 million.  The deal was approved by the FCC on July 2, 2007, and the transaction was consummated on October 1, 2007.  As part of an internal corporate reorganization in October 2007, Bicoastal Willamette Valley, LLC, applied to transfer the broadcast license for KEJO to Bicoastal Media Licenses V, LLC.  The transfer was approved by the FCC on October 29, 2007.

References

External links
FCC History Cards for KEJO
KEJO official website

EJO
Sports radio stations in the United States
Radio stations established in 1955
Corvallis, Oregon
CBS Sports Radio stations
Fox Sports Radio stations
1955 establishments in Oregon